East End of Rundle (EEOR) is a mountain located immediately west of the town of Canmore, Alberta and immediately west of the Spray Lakes road in the Canadian Rockies. Mount Rundle occupies the space between Canmore and Banff on the southwest side of the Trans-Canada Highway.

There is a scrambling route up from the Spray Lakes road.

Geology

The mountain is composed of sedimentary rock laid down during the Precambrian to Jurassic periods. Formed in shallow seas, this sedimentary rock was pushed east and over the top of younger rock during the Laramide orogeny.

Climate

Based on the Köppen climate classification, the mountain is located in a subarctic climate with cold, snowy winters, and mild summers. Temperatures can drop below −20 °C with wind chill factors below −30 °C. Precipitation runoff from Rundle drains into the Bow River which is a tributary of the Saskatchewan River.

See also
List of mountains of Canada
Geography of Alberta

References

Gallery

External links
Scramble description from www.scrambling.ca

Two-thousanders of Alberta
Alberta's Rockies